HyperFont is a monospaced sans-serif font developed in 1993 by Hilgraeve Inc. to be used by the HyperTerminal terminal emulation application program included in Microsoft Windows.
Three different font type versions are available:
 Hyperdk.fon -	HyperFont Dark (raster font)
 Hyperlt.fon -	HyperFont Light (raster font)
 Hypertt.ttf -	HyperFont (trueType)

HyperFont was created to allow an 80-column view in the HyperTerminal window. OEM/DOS is the visualized font code.

Monospaced typefaces
Sans-serif typefaces
Typefaces and fonts introduced in 1993